José Macías is a Panamanian retired utility man

José Macías may also refer to:
José Juan Macías (born 1999), Mexican professional footballer
José Ulises Macías Salcedo (born 1940), Mexican Roman Catholic archbishop
José Natividad Macías (1857–1948), Mexican attorney